Christopher Hall (born Robert Christopher Hall, May 18, 1965) is an American musician best known as a founding member and vocalist for the industrial rock band Stabbing Westward. Hall met keyboardist Walter Flakus in 1984 and formed the band in Macomb,  Illinois. After the breakup of Stabbing Westward in 2002, Hall founded a new band, The Dreaming in 2001. After reuniting in 2016, Hall has remained active with Stabbing Westward and released a new album, titled Chasing Ghosts in March of 2022.

Personal life 
Hall has stated that he attended Western Illinois University during the early years of Stabbing Westward, alongside keyboardist Walter Flakus. Hall is married and has 2 sons. In July 2022, Hall announced that he had been diagnosed with throat cancer.

Discography

Stabbing Westward 
1994 - Ungod

1996 - Wither Blister Burn & Peel

1998 - Darkest Days

2001 - Stabbing Westward

2022 - Chasing Ghosts

The Dreaming 
2008 - Etched In Blood

2011 - Puppet

2015 - Rise Again

References

External links
 The Dreaming MySpace page
Stabbing Westward official website

American male singers
American rock singers
American industrial musicians
Living people
1965 births
Stabbing Westward members
Western Illinois University alumni